Quilticohyla erythromma, commonly known as the Guerreran stream frog, is a species of frog in the family Hylidae endemic to Mexico. Its natural habitats are subtropical or tropical dry forests, subtropical or tropical moist lowland forests, rivers, and freshwater marshes. It is threatened by habitat loss.

References

Quilticohyla
Endemic amphibians of Mexico
Fauna of the Sierra Madre del Sur
Frogs of North America
Endangered biota of Mexico
Endangered fauna of North America
Amphibians described in 1937
Taxonomy articles created by Polbot